Plague of Spells is a novel written by Bruce Cordell and published in December 2008.

Plot summary
After the Spellplague, Raidon Kane finds that he has a sapphire tattoo burned into his flesh, strange supernatural powers that aid him in fighting aberrant monstrosities such as aboleths, and that he is missing eleven years of his life that he spent encased in crystal. In that time, his daughter has died and his home has been destroyed. The evil empire known as  the Abolethic Sovereignty has become active and intends to reduce the world to chaos using a powerful artifact known as the Dreamheart. The Dreamheart begins infecting weak minds with twisted dreams of power if they serve the aboleths, causing the corrupted to fight over the Dreamheart and use it to their own ends. Raidon seeks a weapon forged by those who fought the Sovereignty before him. Guidance from an abandoned construct created to monitor and hold the high priest of the Sovereignty prisoner leads him to seek the weapon in the spellplague-infested Plaguewrought Lands.  Raidon also seeks allies uncorrupted by the power of the Sovereignty.

Reception
One reviewer commented that "Plague of Spells is an excellent addition to the ever-expanding Forgotten Realms library." Another reviewer stated that "I recommend Plague of Spells for any reader."

One reviewer was more critical: "If you're not really a Dungeons and Dragons fan I don't think I can really recommend Plague of Spells. It has the potential of being something really good but it is a potential that remains largely unfulfilled."

References

2008 American novels

American fantasy novels
Forgotten Realms novels
Novels by Bruce Cordell